Sessano del Molise is a comune (municipality) in the Province of Isernia in the Italian region Molise, located about  northwest of Campobasso and about  northeast of Isernia.

Sessano del Molise borders the following municipalities: Carpinone, Chiauci, Civitanova del Sannio, Frosolone, Miranda, Pesche, Pescolanciano.

Demographic evolution

People
Carmine Pecorelli

References

Cities and towns in Molise